Even Hansen (9 June 1923 – 5 March 2016) was a Norwegian footballer.

He played for Storm BK before playing for Odds BK from 1952 to 1958. He was also capped once for Norway.

References

1923 births
2016 deaths
Sportspeople from Skien
Norwegian footballers
Odds BK players
Norway international footballers
Association football defenders